"My ABC's" is the 155th episode of the television series Scrubs, and the fifth episode of the series' eighth season. It was broadcast on January 27, 2009 on ABC.

Plot
The episode starts with J.D., Turk, and Izzy watching Sesame Street. J.D., Elliot and Dr. Cox each choose an intern to work with. J.D. picks Denise, who lacks compassion towards patients. Also, throughout the whole show, J.D. calls Denise "Jo" because she reminds him of a character from The Facts of Life. Their patient has lung cancer that has been in remission, and they haven't told his eight-year-old son of the cancer. They hope the illness is a minor infection, but after J.D. runs tests he finds that the cancer has returned. J.D. sends Denise to tell the man's distraught wife. J.D. tells her that she shouldn't let the wife put her husband on machines, which would only cause more pain. In response, Denise bluntly tells her that if she does put her husband on machines, it might lead to an infection and then to antibiotics, causing him more pain because she was "too selfish to let him go".

Elliot's intern Katie tries to use her to land a case study with Turk, who eventually gives the case study to Katie after some prodding from Elliot and Carla. In the end, however, Elliot learns that Katie has not changed at all upon overhearing her say that she'll be fine in the hospital because she "has Dr. Reid wrapped around her finger."

Dr. Cox chooses Ed, who is lazy and arrogant, but talented. He tries to figure out why he hates him so much, finally figuring it out after witnessing Ed refusing the case study.

The episode ends with J.D., Elliot, and Dr. Cox looking on solemnly as their respective interns collectively leave the hospital for the day. Elliot sighs and notes that "it's going to be a long year."

Broadcast
 This episode was originally scheduled to air on January 20, but was rescheduled to a week later so that ABC could cover the Neighborhood Ball to celebrate the Presidential inauguration of Barack Obama.
 This episode was originally intended to be the season premiere, but ABC decided to change in order to have the Courteney Cox character introduced in the first episode, as such they did some pick-up shots referring to things in the middle of the season.

Cultural references
 The song at the end of the episode is a cover of the Sesame Street theme song by Joshua Radin.
Dr. Cox asks the new interns if any of them watch Deal or No Deal. After an intern raises their hand, he tells them to leave.
 This episode includes appearances by four Sesame Street Muppets: Oscar the Grouch, played by Caroll Spinney; Grover, played by Eric Jacobson; Elmo, played by Kevin Clash, and an Anything Muppet named "Ex Ray", played by Stephanie D'Abruzzo.
 D'Abruzzo had previously appeared on-screen herself as the patient in the musical episode, "My Musical".
 The title of this episode is also a reference to the recent switch of Scrubs to ABC, as well as a reference to the fact that the Sesame Street Muppets make an appearance.

Reception
This episode was watched by 5.12 million American viewers. The episode following this one was viewed by 5.05 million, averaging 5.09 million viewers for the hour.

References

External links
 

Scrubs (season 8) episodes
2009 American television episodes
Crossover fiction